Min Sekkya (1536–1572) was king of Arakan from 1564 to 1572. He succeeded his elder half-brother King Min Saw Hla, who had chosen him to be the heir apparent. The northern vassal of Tripura, which had submitted to Min Saw Hla, revolted and for a time, he lost control of Chittagong. He regained the city but his attempt to reassert control over Tripura was not successful. He continued the construction projects of his brother. He was married to his half-sister Dhamma Dewi but after she died, he married Saw Thanda, who had been queen of both his brother Min Saw Hla and his father Min Dikkha. He died of natural causes in 1572, and was succeeded by his paternal uncle Min Phalaung.

References

Bibliography
 

Monarchs of Mrauk-U
1536 births
1572 deaths
16th century in the Mrauk-U Kingdom
16th-century Burmese monarchs